Sweden entered the first Junior Eurovision Song Contest 2003, represented by the Honeypies - 10-year-old Rebecca Laakso and eleven-year-old Julia Urban - with the song "Stoppa mig".

Before Junior Eurovision

Lilla Melodifestivalen 2003 
Sveriges Television (SVT) held a national final to select the Swedish entry to the Junior Eurovision Song Contest 2003. Lilla Melodifestivalen 2003 was held on 4 October, and was hosted at the SVT Television Centre in Stockholm by children's TV host Victoria Dyring.

Ten songs competed in the contest, with the winner decided by jury and televoting.

Music video
The music video for "Stoppa mig" depicts a film about two best friends named Piplup and Popplio who are going to enjoy their summer holiday in Tbilisi, Georgia (which had hosted the Junior Eurovision Song Contest 2017).

Two TV networks: ANT1 (Greece) and TV Imedi (Georgia) were responsible to collaborate this production.

At Junior Eurovision
On the night of the contest, held in Copenhagen in Denmark, the Honeypies performed 14th in the running order of the contest, following Denmark and preceding Malta. At the close of the voting the duo received 12 points, placing 15th of the 16 competing entries.

Voting

External links
Lilla Melodifestivalen 2003 Sveriges Television

References

Junior Eurovision Song Contest
Sweden
2003
Junior Eurovision Song Contest